Michael James Fox (born August 5, 1967) is a former American football defensive lineman. He was drafted by the New York Giants in the second round (51st overall) of the 1990 NFL draft. He played college football at West Virginia.

He also played for the Carolina Panthers.

College career
In 1989, Fox finished the year with 10 sacks while playing defensive tackle - making him the only player at the time to generate 10 sacks from any position other than defensive end or linebacker. Fox had three multi-sack games, including the Syracuse game in which he recorded nine tackles, two sacks, and two tackles for a loss. Fox also finished with 71 tackles and the Gator Bowl MVP trophy. At the end of the 1989 season, he played for the East team in the East-West Shrine Game. He was also named to the Associated Press (AP) All-East first-team.

Professional career
Fox was selected in the second round (51st overall) of the 1990 NFL draft by the New York Giants.

In 1995, Fox signed a five-year contract with the Carolina Panthers.

In 1999, Fox was placed in the 1999 NFL expansion draft by the Panthers. After not being selected by the Cleveland Browns in the expansion draft, he was cut by the Panthers.

References

1967 births
Living people
Players of American football from Akron, Ohio
American football defensive linemen
West Virginia Mountaineers football players
New York Giants players
Carolina Panthers players